John Edward Bolling (born February 20, 1917 in Mobile, Alabama) was a first baseman in Major League Baseball during the 1939 and 1944 seasons.

In 125 games over two seasons, Bolling posted a .313 batting average (107-for-342) with 48 runs, 4 home runs, 38 RBIs and 25 bases on balls. He finished his major league career with a .985 fielding percentage.

External links

1917 births
1998 deaths
Alabama Crimson Tide baseball players
Baseball players from Alabama
Brooklyn Dodgers players
Philadelphia Phillies players
Major League Baseball first basemen
DeLand Reds players
Macon Peaches players
Atlanta Crackers players
Columbus Red Birds players
Sacramento Solons players
New Orleans Pelicans (baseball) players
St. Paul Saints (AA) players
Mobile Bears players